The E99 is a UAE road starting from UAE/OMAN border through the Hajar mountain range on the eastern coast connecting the two cities of Dibba Al-Fujairah and Khor Fakkan.

References: 

Roads in the United Arab Emirates